Brendan Worth (born 18 July 1984) is an Australian former rugby league footballer who last played for the Cessnock Goannas in the Newcastle Rugby League.  Before joining Cessnock, Worth played in the NRL for the Newcastle Knights and the Penrith Panthers and played in France for Toulouse Olympique.  Worth's position of choice was as a prop.

Background
Worth was born in Darwin, Northern Territory, Australia.

Playing career
At the end of the 2009 season, for his first year at Toulouse, Worth received the 2009 Toulouse Player of the Year award from the sang-et-or website.

References

External links
Toulouse Olympique profile

1984 births
Living people
Australian rugby league players
Cessnock Goannas players
Kurri Kurri Bulldogs players
Newcastle Knights players
Penrith Panthers players
Rugby league players from Darwin, Northern Territory
Rugby league props
Toulouse Olympique players
Windsor Wolves players